The 1954 Southern Conference men's basketball tournament took place from March 4–6, 1954 at the West Virginia Fieldhouse in Morgantown, West Virginia. The George Washington Colonials, led by head coach William Reinhart, won their second Southern Conference title and received the automatic berth to the 1954 NCAA tournament.

Format
The top eight finishers of the conference's ten members were eligible for the tournament. Teams were seeded based on conference winning percentage. The tournament used a preset bracket consisting of three rounds.

Bracket

* Overtime game

See also
List of Southern Conference men's basketball champions

References

Tournament
Southern Conference men's basketball tournament
Southern Conference Men's B
Southern Conference men's basketball tournament